Lapinjärvi is a municipality of Finland. It is located in the Uusimaa region. The municipality has a population of 
which 
is water. The population density is
.

Neighbouring municipalities are Iitti, Kouvola, Loviisa, Myrskylä and Orimattila.

The municipality is bilingual, with majority being Finnish and minority Swedish speakers.

Lapinjärvi lake is located near the administrative village center in Lapinjärvi.

Politics
Results of the 2011 Finnish parliamentary election in Lapinjärvi:

Swedish People's Party 33.2%
Centre Party 16.8%
True Finns 16.2%
National Coalition Party 11.2%
Social Democratic Party 10.4%
Green League 4.3%
Left Alliance 3.9%
Christian Democrats 2.1%

People born in Lapinjärvi
Gustaf Rosenqvist (1855–1931)
Vilhelm Rosenqvist (1856–1925)
Hilda Käkikoski (1864–1912)
Otto Slätis (1864–1940)
Johan Strömberg (1868–1952)
Gustaf Storgårds (1869–1945)
Mikko Innanen (1978 –)

See also
Lapinjärvi Educational Center

References

External links

Municipality of Lapinjärvi – Official website 

Populated places established in 1575
Lapinjärvi (municipality)